K103 may refer to:

 HMCS Alberni (K103), a Canadian Royal Navy corvette
 KKCW, the radio station "K103" broadcasting in Portland, Oregon
 CKRK-FM, the radio station "K103" broadcasting in Kahnawake, Quebec
 K-103 (Kansas highway), a state highway in Kansas